The Sarcoptiformes are an order of Acari comprising over 15,000 described species in around 230 families. Previously it was divided into two suborders, Oribatida and Astigmatina, but  Oribatida has been promoted to an order, and Astigmatina is now an unranked taxon.

Families
Families:

 Acaridae
 Acaronychidae
 Achipteriidae
 Adelphacaridae
 Adhaesozetidae
 Aeroglyphidae
 Aleurodamaeidae
 Algophagidae
 Alicorhagiidae
 Alloptidae
 Alycidae
 Ameridae
 Amerobelbidae
 Ameronothridae
 Ametroproctidae
 Analgidae
 Apionacaridae
 Arborichthoniidae
 Arceremaeidae
 Aribatidae
 Ascouracaridae
 Astegistidae
 Atopochthoniidae
 Atopomelidae
 Autognetidae
 Avenzoariidae
 Basilobelbidae
 Belboidae
 Brachychthoniidae
 Caleremaeidae
 Caloppiidae
 Canestrinidae
 Canestriniidae
 Carabodidae
 Carpoglyphidae
 Caudiferidae
 Ceratokalummidae
 Ceratoppiidae
 Ceratozetidae
 Cerocepheidae
 Chaetodactylidae
 Chamobatidae
 Charassobatidae
 Chetochelacaridae
 Cheylabididae
 Chirodiscidae
 Chirorhynchobiidae
 Chortoglyphidae
 Collohmanniidae
 Cosmochthoniidae
 Crotoniidae
 Crypturoptidae
 Ctenacaridae
 Ctenobelbidae
 Cuneoppiidae
 Cymbaeremaeidae
 Cytoditidae
 Damaeidae
 Damaeolidae
 Dameolidae
 Dampfiellidae
 Decoroppiidae
 Dendroeremaeidae
 Dermationidae
 Dermoglyphidae
 Drymobatidae
 Echimyopodidae
 Elliptochthoniidae
 Eniochthoniidae
 Epactozetidae
 Epidermoptidae
 Epilohamanniidae
 Epilohmanniidae
 Epimerellidae
 Eremaeidae
 Eremaeozetidae
 Eremellidae
 Eremobelbidae
 Eremulidae
 Euglycyphagidae
 Eulohmanniidae
 Euphthiracaridae
 Eustathiidae
 Eutegaeidae
 Falculiferidae
 Fortuyniidae
 Freyanidae
 Gabuciniidae
 Galumnellidae
 Galumnidae
 Gastronyssidae
 Gaudiellidae
 Gaudoglyphidae
 Gehypochthoniidae
 Genavensiidae
 Glycacaridae
 Glycyphagidae
 Grandjeanicidae
 Granuloppiidae
 Guanolichidae
 Gustaviidae
 Gymnodamaeidae
 Haplochthoniidae
 Haplozetidae
 Hemileiidae
 Hemisarcoptidae
 Hermanniellidae
 Hermanniidae
 Heterobelbidae
 Heterochthoniidae
 Heterocoptidae
 Histiostomatidae
 Humerobatidae
 Hungarobelbidae
 Hyadesiidae
 Hydrozetidae
 Hypochthoniidae
 Hypoderatidae
 Kiwilichidae
 Knemidokoptidae
 Kodiakellidae
 Kramerellidae
 Lamellareidae
 Laminosioptidae
 Lardoglyphidae
 Lemanniellidae
 Lemurnyssidae
 Liacaridae
 Licneremaeidae
 Licnobelbidae
 Licnodamaeidae
 Liebstadiidae
 Limnozetidae
 Linobiidae
 Listrophoridae
 Lobalgidae
 Lohmanniidae
 Lyroppiidae
 Machadobelbidae
 Machuellidae
 Mahuellidae
 Malaconothridae
 Maudheimiidae
 Meliponocoptidae
 Mesoplophoridae
 Micreremidae
 Micropsammidae
 Microtegeidae
 Microzetidae
 Mochlozetidae
 Mucronothridae
 Multoribulidae
 Myocoptidae
 Nanhermanniidae
 Nanhermanniidea
 Nanohystricidae
 Nanorchestidae
 Nehypochthoniidae
 Nematalycidae
 Neoliodidae
 Nesozetidae
 Niphocepheidae
 Nippobodidae
 Nodocepheidae
 Nosybeidae
 Nothridae
 Ochrolichidae
 Oconnoriidae
 Oehserchestidae
 Oppidae
 Oppiidae
 Oribatellidae
 Oribatulidae
 Oribellidae
 Oribotritiidae
 Oripodidae
 Otocepheidae
 Oxyameridae
 Pachygnathidae
 Palaeacaridae
 Papillonotidae
 Parakalummidae
 Parakalumnidae
 Parhypochthoniidae
 Passalozetidae
 Pedetopodidae
 Pediculochelidae
 Peloppiidae
 Pelopsidae
 Perlohmanniidae
 Phenopelopidae
 Pheroliodidae
 Phthiracaridae
 Pirnodidae
 Plasmobatidae
 Plateremaeidae
 Platyameridae
 Pneumocoptidae
 Podacaridae
 Podopterotegaeidae
 Polypterozetidae
 Proctophyllodidae
 Proteonematalycidae
 Proterorhagiidae
 Prothoplophoridae
 Protoplophoridae
 Protoribatidae
 Psammochthoniidae
 Pseudoppiidae
 Psoroptidae
 Psoroptoididae
 Pterolichidae
 Pteronyssidae
 Ptiloxenidae
 Ptyssalgidae
 Punctoribatidae
 Pyroglyphidae
 Quadroppiidae
 Rectijanuidae
 Rhynchoribatidae
 Rhyncoptidae
 Rioppiidae
 Rosensteiniidae
 Salvidae
 Sarcoptidae
 Scatoglyphidae
 Scheloribatidae
 Schizoglyphidae
 Scutoverticidae
 Selenoribatidae
 Sphaerochthoniidae
 Spinozetidae
 Staurobatidae
 Sternoppiidae
 Suctobelbidae
 Suidasiidae
 Symbioribatidae
 Synichotritiidae
 Syringobiidae
 Tectocepheidae
 Tegeocranellidae
 Tegoribatidae
 Tenuialidae
 Teratoppiidae
 Terpnacaridae
 Tetracondylidae
 Thoracosathesidae
 Thyrisomidae
 Thysanocercidae
 Tokunocepheidae
 Trhypochthoniellidae
 Trhypochthoniidae
 Trichthoniidae
 Trizetidae
 Trouessartiidae
 Tubulozetidae
 Tumerozetidae
 Tuparezetidae
 Turbinoptidae
 Unduloribatidae
 Vexillariidae
 Winterschmidtiidae
 Xenillidae
 Xolalgidae
 Zetomotrichidae
 Zetorchestidae

References

 
Arachnid orders
Taxa named by Enzio Reuter